Gurgamoya (Kharosthi: 𐨒𐨂𐨪𐨿𐨒𐨨𐨆𐨩) was a king of the Kingdom of Khotan in the 1st century CE.

His coins were usually made of bronze and included legends in Kharosthi and Chinese. The Kharoshthi describes the title of the king, while the Chinese give the weight of the coin. The Kharoshti points to relations with northern India, which at that time was ruled by the Kushan Empire, with its powerful ruler Kujula Kadphises, who was also known by the Chinese.

Gurgamoya is thought to have ruled circa 30-60 CE.

Coins

Notes

Central Asian Buddhist kingdoms